David Meade Woodson (May 18, 1806 – August 26, 1877) was an American jurist and legislator.

Biography
Born in Jessamine County, Kentucky, Woodson received his bachelor's degree from Transylvania University. He served in the Kentucky House of Representatives in 1832 as a Whig. In 1834, Woodson moved to Greene County, Illinois and served as state's attorney for Greene County. From 1840 to 1842 and from 1869 to 1870, Woodson served in the Illinois House of Representatives as a Whig and later as a Democrat. He served in the 1847 Illinois Constitutional Convention. Then, in 1848, Woodson served on the Illinois Supreme Court for one month. From 1848 to 1867, Woodson served as an Illinois Circuit Court judge. He then practiced law in Carrollton, Illinois, Woodson died in Carrollton, Illinois.

Notes

External links

1806 births
1877 deaths
People from Carrollton, Illinois
People from Jessamine County, Kentucky
Transylvania University alumni
Justices of the Illinois Supreme Court
Illinois state court judges
Illinois Democrats
Illinois Whigs
19th-century American politicians
Kentucky Whigs
Members of the Illinois House of Representatives
Members of the Kentucky House of Representatives
19th-century American judges